Tom Habscheid (born 11 August 1986) is a Paralympic athlete from Luxembourg. He is a two-time silver medalist at the World Para Athletics Championships and a six-time medalist at the World Para Athletics European Championships.

He represented Luxembourg at the 2016 Summer Paralympics in Rio de Janeiro, Brazil and the 2020 Summer Paralympics in Tokyo, Japan.

Career 

He won the silver medal in the men's discus throw F42 event at the 2014 IPC Athletics European Championships held in Swansea, United Kingdom. In 2016, he represented Luxembourg at the 2016 Summer Paralympics in Rio de Janeiro, Brazil. He finished in 7th place in the men's shot put F42 event. In 2017, he won the silver medal with a new personal best of 46.83 metres in the men's discus throw F42 event at the 2017 World Para Athletics Championships held in London, United Kingdom.

At the beginning of 2018, World Para Athletics implemented classification changes and, as of that year, he competes as a T63-classified athlete, a class specifically for athletes with a single above the knee amputation. In that year, he won the silver medal in both the men's discus throw F63 and men's shot put F63 events at the 2018 World Para Athletics European Championships held in Berlin, Germany.

In 2019, he won the silver medal in the men's shot put F63 event at the World Para Athletics Championships held in Dubai, United Arab Emirates. He also set a new world record of 15.10 metres. In 2021, he won the silver medal in the men's shot put F63 event at the World Para Athletics European Championships held in Bydgoszcz, Poland. He finished in 4th place in the men's shot put F63 event at the 2020 Summer Paralympics held in Tokyo, Japan.

Achievements

References

External links 
 

Living people
1986 births
Place of birth missing (living people)
Athletes (track and field) at the 2016 Summer Paralympics
Athletes (track and field) at the 2020 Summer Paralympics
Luxembourgian male discus throwers
Luxembourgian male shot putters
Paralympic athletes of Luxembourg
Paralympic medalists in athletics (track and field)
Medalists at the World Para Athletics Championships
Medalists at the World Para Athletics European Championships
Luxembourgian amputees